Parallel World or Parallel Worlds may refer to:

Parallel World (1983 video game), a video game published by Enix for home computers
Parallel World (1990 video game), a video game published by Varie for the Family Computer
Parallel World (Cadence Weapon album), a 2021 album by Cadence Weapon
Parallel Worlds (album), a 1993 album by Dave Douglas
Parallel Worlds (book), a 2004 popular science book by Michio Kaku 
"Parallel Worlds" (song), a 2007 song by Elliot Minor

See also
Parallel universe (disambiguation)
Parallel worlds chess
Parallel Worlds, Parallel Lives